Gab Mejia is a Filipino conservation photographer based in Manila, Philippines.

The focus of Mejia's work is for the conservation of wetlands and wildlife. He is a National Geographic Explorer, Nikon Asia Ambassador, and a columnist for The Manila Times. In 2021, he was awarded the World Wide Fund For Nature International President's Youth Award. Mejia was listed on the 2021 Forbes Under 30 List for The Arts in Asia for photography.

In 2017, he was the highly-commended finalist for the Global Wetlands Youth Photo Contest by the Ramsar Convention on Wetlands.

Personal life 
Mejia was fathered by Saturnino Mejia in the Philippines, and has three older siblings. In 2011, he climbed his first  international mountain in Malaysia in Mount Kinabalu. He is a certified PADI scuba diver, and took on professional photography to document nature in the Philippines.

Early life and education 
In 2016, he was selected to be part of the Young Southeast Asian Leaders Initiative for marine conservation in the United States Aid Oceans Workshop in Jakarta, Indonesia.

Mejia completed his Bachelors of Science degree in Civil Engineering specialising on research on Environmental and Energy Engineering in the University of the Philippines. He co-authored an academic paper in the Wetlands Science Practice Journal (January 2020). He joined environmental organisations such as the Marine Biological Society, and was chosen as an Ambassador for Sustainability for the Eurail Europe on Track Program. In 2019, he joined the Jackson Wild Media Lab Fellowship in the Jackson Wild Summit for natural-history filmmaking and science communication. He was accepted in the Emerging League Program Fellowship of the International League of Conservation Photographers in 2021.

Photography
He won the Global Wetlands Youth Photo Contest 2017 with his photo of the Gabaldon floodplain in Mt. Sawi, Nueva Ecija.

Mejia has published photographic stories on National Geographic, the Ramsar Convention on Wetlands, World Wide Fund for Nature (WWF), CNN, and the United Nations Development Programme (UNDP).

He is a National Geographic Explorer, Nikon Asia Ambassador, and a columnist for The Manila Times.

Social work 
In 2018, he received an Early Career-Grant from National Geographic Society. In 2018, he joined the World Wildlife Fund National Youth Council, and co-founded Youth Engaged in Wetlands (YEW).

Mejia co-founded the international non-profit environment youth organization for the conservation of wetlands and migratory birds named Youth Engaged in Wetlands. In 2018, he joined the 13th Conference of the Parties (COP13) of the Ramsar Convention on Wetlands in Dubai, UAE to involve the youth sector in the decision-making processes. Mejia is also part of the National Youth Council of the World Wide Fund for Nature, that engages youth through environmental education programs in schools around the Philippines such as the Far Eastern University. He has presented environmental stories in TEDx talks and other international platforms. Mejia is a supporter of the Scarisbrick Hall Global Classroom.

Between 2018-2020, he worked in the Agusan Marshlands to document the struggles and progress of the Manobo Tribe in the Philippines amid climate change. Additional projects include documenting the endangered wildlife such as the Tamaraw in the Philippines.

In 2021, he has been awarded the World Wide Fund for Nature International President's Youth award. Mejia is the first Filipino to win this environmental award.

Awards 
 2017 Grand winner of Global Youth Wetlands Photo Competition by the Ramsar Convention on Wetlands
 2018 Best Cultural Photo Award in Transformed by Travel Photo Competition by Cultural Vistas.
 2019 National Geographic Early-Career Grant
 2019 Brand Ambassador Nikon Asia
 2020 Tatler Asia Gen T. Honoree: 400 Leaders Below 40 For dedicating his career to saving global wetlands
 2020 Inaugural cohort of National Geographic Field Ready Program
2020 National Geographic COVID-19 Journalist Grant.
2021 Forbes Under 30: The Arts
 2021 World Wide Fund for Nature International President's Youth Award
 Named by Tatler Asia as a Generation T. Honouree in the list of 400 Leaders Below 40 shaping the future of Southeast Asia.

References

External links 
 
 Gab Mejia on The Manila Times

Filipino photographers
Conservationists
Filipino columnists
Year of birth missing (living people)
Living people